Judas Moseamedi (born 22 January 1994) is a South African soccer player who plays as a forward for Stellenbosch. He has played internationally for South Africa.

References

1994 births
Living people
South African soccer players
People from Tzaneen
Sportspeople from Limpopo
Association football forwards
Mpumalanga Black Aces F.C. players
Cape Town City F.C. (2016) players
Free State Stars F.C. players
Maritzburg United F.C. players
Stellenbosch F.C. players
South African Premier Division players
South Africa international soccer players